Peter Horton (born August 20, 1953) is an American actor and director. He played Professor Gary Shepherd on the television series Thirtysomething from 1987 until 1991.

Early life and education
Horton was born in Bellevue, Washington, to a father who worked in the shipping business. He attended Redwood High School in Marin County, California, and Principia College in Illinois. He later attended University of California, Santa Barbara, where he received a Bachelor of Arts degree in music composition.

Career
During his run on Thirtysomething, People magazine named him one of the "50 Most Beautiful People". Horton acted in television shows including St. Elsewhere, The White Shadow, Dallas, Eight Is Enough, "In Treatment" and The Geena Davis Show, played the lead in the short-lived series Brimstone, and played Crane McFadden in the one season series (1982–1983) "Seven Brides for Seven Brothers". He played Jacob in the 1982 feature film Split Image, Father Mahoney in the 1986 feature film "Where the River Runs Black" Roy Fox in the 1996 film "Two Days In The Valley" and played Burt in the 1984 Stephen King movie Children of the Corn. He had a minor role in Cameron Crowe's Seattle romantic comedy, Singles. He played Harry Landers in the "Hospital" skit from Amazon Women on the Moon opposite wife Michelle Pfeiffer, whom he had previously directed in the ABC Afterschool Special One Too Many in 1985. Horton also appeared in the 1997 TV movie version of the Jon Krakauer book Into Thin Air: Death on Everest, playing Scott Fischer, the leader of the disastrous 1996 climb on Mount Everest. He was also in the movie Sideout (1990) as Zach Barnes, a down and out ex-volleyball champ. As a director he has worked on several television series including The Shield, Thirtysomething, The Wonder Years, Once and Again, and directed the pilot for Grey's Anatomy as well as pilots for Class of '96, Birdland, Dirty Sexy Money, The Philanthropist and Reconstruction.  He directed the 1990 film for television Extreme Close-up as well as the 1995 feature film The Cure. As a producer he produced Reconstruction (which he co-created), Lone Star, The Philanthropist, The Body Politic (which he also co-created), Grey's Anatomy, Six Degrees and Murder Live (for which he wrote the story).

He appeared in Who Killed the Electric Car? and is on the board of directors of the Environmental Alliance.

As of 2010 Horton is an executive producer and director of Grey's Anatomy on ABC, and produced and directed NBC's The Philanthropist. In 2015, he signed a deal with Universal TV. His production company is Pico Creek Productions. Horton co-created the 2015 series American Odyssey.

Personal life
In the late 1970s, Horton dated actress Valerie Harper. Horton has been married twice. His first marriage was to Michelle Pfeiffer, whom he met in Milton Katselas's acting class. The couple married in 1981. Of their relationship, Pfeiffer reflected, "I broke one of my own Ten Commandments never to date an actor, especially one you study with. Then I married one!" The couple divorced in 1988. The divorce was amicable, with Horton saying both his and Pfeiffer's devotion to their careers affected the marriage.

He has been married to Nicole Deputron since 1995 and the couple have two children, Lily (b. 1999) and Ruby (b. 2002).

Filmography

Film

Television

References

External links
 

1953 births
American male film actors
American male television actors
American television directors
Living people
Male actors from Washington (state)
People from Bellevue, Washington
Principia College alumni
University of California, Santa Barbara alumni
Redwood High School (Larkspur, California) alumni